Tropacme is a monotypic moth genus in the subfamily Arctiinae. Its single species, Tropacme cupreimargo, is found in Myanmar and Assam, India. The species and the genus were first described by George Hampson in 1894.

References

Lithosiini
Moths described in 1894
Monotypic moth genera
Moths of Asia